Niagara Falls Marriott on the Falls is a 335 feet (102 m) tall hotel in Niagara Falls, Ontario, Canada. 

The hotel opened in 1993 as 20-story the Sheraton Fallsview Hotel. The hotel was expanded in 2000, adding floors 22–31. The hotel left Sheraton for Marriott in 2011 and became the Marriott Gateway on the Falls. It was renamed Niagara Falls Marriott on the Falls in 2017. There are two rooms on the 32nd floor which are only used when the hotel has no rooms (or by request).  Being one of the tallest structures in the city, it can be seen throughout the general tourist area.

The hotel was host to the first webcam overlooking Niagara Falls. Installed in 1998 at the former top floor prior to the expansion in 2000. In 2012 the webcam was replaced as part of the $15 million renovation of the structure initiated in 2011.

This is one of the original Fallsview hotels.

See also 
Marriott International
Marriott Hotels
Marriott Niagara Falls Hotel Fallsview & Spa
Niagara Fallsview Casino Resort

References
 Niagara Falls Marriott on the Falls

Hotel buildings completed in 1993
Buildings and structures in Niagara Falls, Ontario
Hotels established in 1993
Hotels in Ontario
Marriott hotels
Skyscraper hotels in Canada
1993 establishments in Ontario